WFSY (98.5 FM) is a radio station which normally broadcasts an adult contemporary format but during the holidays, broadcasts Christmas music. Licensed to Panama City, Florida, United States, the station also serves the Dothan, AL market.  The station is currently owned by iHeartMedia and features programming from Premiere Networks. Current morning programming includes that of Murphy, Sam, and Jodi.

History
WFSY went on the air as WGNE-FM in 1971, an FM simulcast of AM beautiful music station WGNE. Because of its position at 98.5 MHz, its callsign was advertised as standing for "Genie Ninety Eight", rather than the AM station's, which just represented its tagline, "Genie Radio".

After the AM station was sold to Gulf Coast Community College (now Gulf Coast State College) in 1982, the station flipped to an oldies format, which lasted until 1986.

In 1986, WGNE-FM became WFSY, marketed as "Sunny 98.5", and flipped from oldies to AC.

In 1997, WFSY, WPBH, WDIZ, and WPAP were sold to iHeartMedia (then known as ClearChannel).

References

External links

FSY
IHeartMedia radio stations
Radio stations established in 1971
1971 establishments in Florida